The 6th World Table Tennis Championships were held in Prague from 25 to 30 January 1932.

Medalists

Team

Individual

References

External links
ITTF Museum

 
World Table Tennis Championships
World Table Tennis Championships
World Table Tennis Championships
Table tennis competitions in Czechoslovakia
International sports competitions hosted by Czechoslovakia
Sports competitions in Prague
January 1932 sports events
1930s in Prague